María Luisa Calle Williams (born October 3, 1968) is a Colombian professional racing cyclist. She was born in Medellín.

In the 2004 Summer Olympics, she won a bronze medal in the cycling women's points race, the first Colombian to win a medal in cycling.  She was forced to return the medal after positive test result for the banned stimulant heptaminol. The medal was returned, however, after the test result was proven incorrect.

On October 16, 2011, at the 2011 Pan American Games' individual time trial, Calle, 43 years old at the time, won the gold medal with a time of 28:04.82.

On 22 July 2015, it was disclosed that she had tested positive for GHRP2 at the 2015 Pan American Games and was subsequently banned for four years.

Major results

1999
 1st  Road Race, National Road Championships
 2nd in Pan American Games, Track, Pursuit, Winnipeg (CAN)
 3rd in Pan American Games, Track, Points Race, Winnipeg (CAN)
2001
 1st in Pan American Championships, Track, Pursuit, Medellin (COL)
2002
 1st  Individual Time Trial, National Road Championships
 2nd in Tour de Toona, Altoona (USA)
2004
 3rd in Olympic Games, Track, Points race, Athens (GRE)
2005
 1st in Pan American Championships, Track, Pursuit, Mar del Plata (ARG)
2006
 1st in Pan American Championships, Track, Pursuit, Sao Paulo (BRA)
  in Central American and Caribbean Games, Road, Individual Time Trial, Cartagena (COL)
 2nd in Los Angeles, Pursuit (F) (USA)
 1st in World Championship, Track, Scratch, Bordeaux (FRA)
2007
 3rd in Los Angeles, Pursuit (F) (USA)
 2nd in World Championship, Track, Scratch, Palma de Mallorca (ESP)
 2nd Road race, National Road Championships
 1st  Individual Time Trial, National Road Championships
 1st in Pan American Championships, Track, Pursuit, Valencia (VEN)
2008
 2nd in Los Angeles, Pursuit (F) (USA)
 2nd in Cali, Pursuit (F) (COL)
 2nd in Cali, Team pursuit (F) (COL)
2010
 1st in South American Games, Road, Individual time trial, Medellín (COL)
 3rd in South American Games, Road, Road race, Medellín (COL)
2011
  in 2011 Pan American Games, Road, Individual Time Trial, Guadalajara (MEX)
  in 2011 Pan American Games, Track, Team Pursuit, Guadalajara (MEX)
 1st  Individual Time Trial, National Road Championships
2012
 1st in Pan American Championships, Track, Pursuit, Mar del Plata (ARG)
 3rd in Cali, Track Cycling World Cup, Team Pursuit (F) (COL)
2013
 2nd in Aguascalientes, Track Cycling World Cup, Pursuit (F) (MEX)
Pan American Track Championships
 2nd  Team Pursuit
 2nd  Points Race
2014
Pan American Track Championships
3rd  Individual Pursuit
3rd  Points Race
3rd  Individual Pursuit, Central American and Caribbean Games

See also
List of stripped Olympic medals
List of doping cases in cycling

References

External links
 
 
 
 
 
 

1968 births
Living people
Colombian female cyclists
Colombian track cyclists
UCI Track Cycling World Champions (women)
Olympic cyclists of Colombia
Olympic medalists in cycling
Olympic bronze medalists for Colombia
Cyclists at the 2000 Summer Olympics
Cyclists at the 2004 Summer Olympics
Cyclists at the 2008 Summer Olympics
Cyclists at the 2012 Summer Olympics
Medalists at the 2004 Summer Olympics
Pan American Games medalists in cycling
Pan American Games gold medalists for Colombia
Pan American Games silver medalists for Colombia
Pan American Games bronze medalists for Colombia
Cyclists at the 1999 Pan American Games
Cyclists at the 2003 Pan American Games
Cyclists at the 2007 Pan American Games
Cyclists at the 2011 Pan American Games
Cyclists at the 2015 Pan American Games
Medalists at the 2003 Pan American Games
Medalists at the 2007 Pan American Games
Medalists at the 2011 Pan American Games
Central American and Caribbean Games medalists in cycling
Central American and Caribbean Games gold medalists for Colombia
Competitors at the 1998 Central American and Caribbean Games
Competitors at the 2002 Central American and Caribbean Games
Competitors at the 2006 Central American and Caribbean Games
Competitors at the 2010 Central American and Caribbean Games
Competitors at the 2014 Central American and Caribbean Games
South American Games medalists in cycling
South American Games gold medalists for Colombia
South American Games bronze medalists for Colombia
South American Games silver medalists for Colombia
Competitors at the 2010 South American Games
Sportspeople from Medellín
Colombian people of English descent
20th-century Colombian women
21st-century Colombian women